Xaero may refer to:

Xaero suborbital rocket
Quake III Arena